Georgia O'Connor (born 18 February 2000) is an English professional boxer. As an amateur, she won a gold medal at the 2017 Commonwealth Youth Games, silver at the 2017 Youth World Championships, and bronze at the 2018 Youth World Championships. She also reached the quarter-finals at the 2018 European Youth Championships after winning bronze and silver medals as a junior in previous editions of the tournament.

Personal life
O'Connor lived in France for a brief period as a child and is a fluent French speaker. As of 2022, she is studying for a degree in civil engineering. She plays the guitar and sings in her spare time.

Professional boxing record

References

2000 births
English women boxers
Sportspeople from Durham, England
Middleweight boxers
Year of birth missing (living people)
Living people